Saatly District is one of the 66 districts of Azerbaijan. It is located in the centre of the country and belongs to the Central Aran Economic Region. The district borders the districts of Imishli, Sabirabad, and Bilasuvar. Its capital and largest city is Saatly. As of 2020, the district had a population of 109,100.

History 
There are several findings relating to ancient settlements in the Saatly District. Archaeological monuments, as well as pottery materials of the 2nd and 3rd millennials B.C, were excavated in villages of Azadkend, Fatalikend, Jafarkhan, Varkhan and Alisoltanly.

The Saatly region was formed on 25 May 1943. During World War II, 1600 residents of Saatly were sent to the front lines and 533 of them died in the war. In 1949, part of the Azerbaijanis expelled from Armenian SSR, Meskhetian Turks from Central Asia in 1958–59, and Azerbaijanis who became displaced due to First Nagorno-Karabakh war settled in the Saatly District.

Saatly has 19 school buildings, a central hospital for 390 people, a cultural centre, 11 medical points in villages, a music school, kindergarten for 450 children, two five-storey buildings with 35 apartments, two-storey mall, other administrative buildings, cotton-cleaning and milk plant, bread making plant as well as other industrial, transportation and service institutions were created in the region during the 1970s-80s.

Geography 
The region is situated in low-land and 28 meters lower above sea level. The region has dry summer with a semi-arid and dry climate. The average temperature is 1.4 °C in January and 26,2 °C in summer. The annual precipitation is 300 mm.

Saatly is mainly an agricultural region. Cotton planting, farming and vegetable production are the main agriculture in the region.

Population 
According to the State Statistics Committee, as of 2018, the population of region recorded 106,5 thousand persons, which increased by 23 thousand persons (27 percent) from 83.5 thousand persons in 2000. 53,9 thousand of total population are men, 52,6 thousand are women.
The region has a significant ethnic Turkish minority, which makes up about 17% of the total population.

Gallery

References 

 
Districts of Azerbaijan